Gene Hoffman may refer to:
 Gene L. Hoffman, American educator and member of the Illinois House of Representatives
 Gene Lyle Hoffman, member of the Iowa Senate

See also
 Jean Hoffman (disambiguation)